Andrew Allan Clyde (March 25, 1892 – May 18, 1967) was a Scottish-born American film and television actor whose career spanned more than four decades. In 1921 he broke into silent films as a Mack Sennett comic, debuting in On a Summer Day. He was the fifth of six children of theatrical actor, producer and manager John Clyde. Clyde's brother David and his sister Jean also became screen actors.

Although Andy Clyde's movie career spanned 45 years, he may be best known for his work as California Carlson in the Hopalong Cassidy movie series. He is also known for roles in two television series: the farmer Cully Wilson in CBS's Lassie and as the neighbor George MacMichael on ABC's The Real McCoys.

Early years

At age 19, he toured Scotland with Durward Lely & Company, playing Connor Martin in the romantic Irish musical costume drama The Wearin’ o’ the Green.
In 1912, Clyde first came to the United States on tour in the Graham Moffat Players, playing the part of Bob Dewar in a vaudeville comedy sketch depicting tenement life in Glasgow called The Concealed Bed. Years later, at the invitation of his close friend James Finlayson, he returned to the United States in 1920 to join producer Mack Sennett's roster of comedians.

Clyde's mastery of makeup allowed him tremendous versatility; he could play everything from grubby young guttersnipes to old crackpot scientists. He hit upon an "old man" characterization in his short comedies, and the masquerade was immediately successful. Adopting a gray wig and mustache, he used this makeup for the rest of his short-subject career, and the character was so durable that he literally grew into it. He starred in short comedies longer than any other actor (32 years, 1924–56).

He made a successful transition to sound films while in Mack Sennett's employ. In 1932, when the Sennett studio was facing financial problems, Sennett cut Clyde's salary. Clyde objected and Sennett put the "old man" costume on character actor Irving Bacon. Audiences reacted adversely, and Sennett abandoned the character. Educational Pictures, Sennett's distributor, took over the Andy Clyde series, which continued for two more years.

Columbia Pictures launched its short subject department in 1934 and Andy Clyde was one of the first comedy stars signed by producer Jules White. Unlike many of the Columbia short-subject comedians who indulged in broad facial and physical gestures, Clyde was subtler and more economical: his comic timing was so good that he could merely lift an eyebrow, shudder slightly, or mutter "My, my, my" for humorous effect. His work for Columbia was prolific enough that, from the mid-1940s, the studio was able to produce lower-budgeted remakes, editing older scenes into the new ones. You Were Never Uglier (1944), for example, was remade with the same principals in 1953 as Hooked and Rooked. Clyde was such an audience favorite that he continued to star in Columbia shorts through 1956. He outlasted every comedian on the Columbia payroll except The Three Stooges.

[[File:Joan Blondell Andy Clyde Real McCoys 1963.JPG|thumb|180px|Clyde as George MacMichael, charmed by Joan Blondell as the McCoys''' Aunt Win]]

Clyde also kept busy as a character actor in feature films; for example, he played a sad provincial postman in the Katharine Hepburn film The Little Minister and Charles Coburn's drinking buddy in The Green Years. In the 1940s, he gravitated toward outdoor and western adventures. Clyde is well remembered for his roles as a comic sidekick, usually teaming with William Boyd in the Hopalong Cassidy series, as "California Carlson" (a role he also played in the Hopalong Cassidy radio program), or with Whip Wilson in Monogram Pictures' low-budget western movies. Clyde also worked on the Hopalong Cassidy "record readers" issued by Capitol Records in the 1950s.

Television career

Clyde's last theatrical film was released in 1956, after which he worked mostly in television, having appeared on Rod Cameron's syndicated series City Detective. On The Pepsi-Cola Playhouse and Studio 57 in 1954 and 1955, respectively, he portrayed Tom Harper in the episode "Santa's Old Suit," with co-star Jane Darwell. Clyde guest-starred in several other early series too, including The People's Choice, Soldiers of Fortune, My Little Margie, The Bob Cummings Show, and Lock Up.

He appeared in two children's programs: as Colonel Jack in four episodes of Circus Boy and as Homer Tubbs in four segments of ABC's western series The Adventures of Rin Tin Tin.

In 1959, Clyde played Captain Gibbs in two segments of the ABC/Warner Brothers western series Colt .45. As "Scatterbrain Gibbs", he appeared with Tol Avery as Barnes in "Queen of Dixie"; in the story line, series character Christopher Colt (Wayde Preston) is aboard a Mississippi River gambling boat and encounters a ring of counterfeiters. Clyde subsequently played "Captain Gibbs" in the episode "Yellow Terror", with Brad Dexter in the role of John Barker.
 
That same year, Clyde portrayed millionaire "Andrew C. Cooley" in the  CBS fantasy drama The Millionaire.

Clyde and Denver Pyle were cast in the 1960 episode "The Man Who Wanted Everything" of the ABC western drama The Man from Blackhawk, starring Robert Rockwell as a roving insurance investigator.

From 1960 to 1962, Clyde was cast as the farmer Pa McBeam in five episodes of the NBC western series The Tall Man, starring Barry Sullivan and Clu Gulager. Judy Nugent plays McBean's daughter, June. In three episodes, Olive Sturgess played daughter May McBeam. In "The Reluctant Bridegroom" (February 18, 1961), Ellen Corby is featured as Hannah Blossom, a potential mail order bride, for Pa McBeam. Through a fraudulent letter written by the McBeam daughters, Hannah is lured to Lincoln, New Mexico, the setting of the series, to seek out the potential husband. In "Substitute Sheriff" (January 6, 1962), the McBeam daughters enlist their father as an acting sheriff in a scheme to thwart the seizure of their property for right-of-way by the railroad.  Bob Hastings appears in this episode as J. S. Chase.

In 1962–1963, Clyde portrayed Dr. Parkinson in three episodes of the NBC medical drama Dr. Kildare, starring Richard Chamberlain.

Clyde was featured several times on Rory Calhoun's CBS western series The Texan, including the part of 
Wild Jack Hastings in "The Troubled Town" and in additional segments as the character Andy Miles.

Clyde further guest-starred in such westerns as Wagon Train, Gunsmoke, Tales of the Texas Rangers, The Restless Gun, Jefferson Drum, Buckskin, Fury, Shotgun Slade, The Man from Blackhawk, and The Life and Legend of Wyatt Earp (as Billy Buckett).

On Lassie, Clyde played the eccentric farmer and nature lover, Cully Wilson, the friend to Timmy Martin, portrayed by child actor Jon Provost, in much the same fashion as Burt Mustin was cast as Gus the fireman for Jerry Mathers in Leave It to Beaver. In The Real McCoys, Clyde performed as the foil for another veteran character actor, Walter Brennan. Clyde played friendly, usually sincere neighbor George MacMichael to Brennan's devious "Grandpa Amos McCoy". Madge Blake played Flora, the sister of George McMichael with something of a romantic interest in Amos McCoy. Later, Clyde was cast as Skippy Draper in one episode of another Brennan ABC series, The Tycoon.

In 1961, on CBS's The Andy Griffith Show, Clyde played Frank Myers, an eccentric old man whom the town tries to evict in the episode "Mayberry Goes Bankrupt". Clyde portrayed Poney Thompson in "Snakebite" in 1958 and Henry Squires in "Durham Bull" in 1962 on CBS's long-running western series Gunsmoke. Clyde appeared as Grandpa Jim Anderson in five episodes of the 1964–65 ABC military comedy No Time for Sergeants, starring Sammy Jackson. The series was inspired by an earlier Andy Griffith film of the same name.

Personal life

On September 23, 1932, Clyde married Elsie Maud Tarron, a former member of the Sennett Bathing Beauties, in Ontario in San Bernardino County, California. Jules White recalled that Clyde became a father in middle age, and was devastated when his son, John Allan Clyde, died of meningitis at age nine.

Clyde was close friends with Ben Turpin, serving as the witness at Turpin's second marriage and a pallbearer at his funeral.

He became a naturalized United States citizen on September 24, 1943.

Clyde continued to perform on television until his death. His remains are interred at Glendale's Forest Lawn Memorial Park.

On February 8, 1960, Clyde received a star on the Hollywood Walk of Fame at 6758 Hollywood Boulevard, for his contribution to the motion pictures industry.

Selected filmographyA Small Town Idol (1921) as Minor role (uncredited)Bow-Wow (1922) as The City SlickerThe Girl from Everywhere (1927) as Publicity ManThe Branded Man (1928) as JenkinsThe Good-Bye Kiss (1928) as The GrandfatherShould a Girl Marry? (1928) as HarryShips of the Night (1928) as AlecBlindfold (1928) as FuneralMidnight Daddies (1930) as Wilbur LouderMillion Dollar Legs (1932) as Major-DomoThe Little Minister (1934) as Wearyworld the policemanRomance in Manhattan (1935) as Liquor Store Owner (uncredited)Annie Oakley (1935) as James MacIvorMcFadden's Flats (1935) as Jock McTavishVillage Tale (1935) as StorekeeperThe Bishop Misbehaves (1935) (scenes deleted)Yellow Dust (1936) as Silas 'Solitaire' CarterStraight from the Shoulder (1936) as J. M. PyneTwo in a Crowd (1936) as JonesyRed Lights Ahead (1936) as Grandpa HawkinsThe Barrier (1937) 'No-Creek' LeeIt's a Wonderful World (1939) as 'Gimpy' WilsonBad Lands (1939) as CluffAbe Lincoln in Illinois (1940) as Stage DriverCherokee Strip (1940) as Tex CrawfordThree Men from Texas (1940) as California CarlsonDoomed Caravan (1941) as California JackIn Old Colorado (1941) as California CarlsonBorder Vigilantes (1941) as California CarlsonPirates on Horseback (1941) as California CarlsonWide Open Town (1941) as California CarlsonStick to Your Guns (1941) as California JackRiders of the Timberline (1941) as California CarlsonTwilight on the Trail (1941) as California CarlsonOutlaws of the Desert (1941) as California CarlsonSecret of the Wastelands (1941) as California CarlsonThis Above All (1942) as Fireman (uncredited)Undercover Man (1942) as California CarlsonLost Canyon (1942) as California CarlsonHoppy Serves a Writ (1943) as California CarlsonBorder Patrol (1943) as California CarlsonThe Leather Burners (1943) as California CarlsonColt Comrades (1943) as California CarlsonBar 20 (1943) as California CarlsonFalse Colors (1943) as California CarlsonRiders of the Deadline (1943) as California CarlsonTexas Masquerade (1944) as California CarlsonLumberjack (1944) as California CarlsonMystery Man (1944) as California CarlsonForty Thieves (1944) as Deputy California CarlsonSundown Riders (1944) as AndyRoughly Speaking (1945) as Matt (uncredited)Song of the Prairie (1945) as Uncle And TylerThrow a Saddle on a Star (1946) as (1946) as Pop WalkerThe Green Years (1946) as Saddler BoagThat Texas Jamboree (1946) as Andy WarrenPlainsman and the Lady (1946) as DurangoThe Devil's Playground (1946) as California CarlsonUnexpected Guest (1947) as California CarlsonDangerous Venture (1947) as California CarlsonThe Marauders (1947) as California CarlsonHoppy's Holiday (1947) as California CarlsonFool's Gold (1947) as California CarlsonSilent Conflict (1948) as California CarlsonThe Dead Don't Dream (1948) as California CarlsonSinister Journey (1948) as California CarlsonBorrowed Trouble (1948) as California CarlsonFalse Paradise (1948) as California CarlsonStrange Gamble (1948) as California CarlsonCrashing Thru (1949) as Winks WinkleShadows of the West (1949) as Winks GraysonBig Jack (1949) as Putt Cleghorn (uncredited)Haunted Trails (1949) as Trigger WinksRiders of the Dust (1949) as Winks HolidayRange Land (1949) as WinksFence Riders (1950) as Winks McGeeGunslingers (1950) as Winks McGeeArizona Territory (1950) as Marshal Luke WatsonSilver Raiders (1950) as Sheriff J. Quincy JonesCherokee Rising (1950) as Deputy Marshal Jake JonesOutlaws of Texas (1950) as U.S. Marshal Hungry RogersAbilene Trail (1951) as Sagebrush CharlieCarolina Cannonball (1955) as Grandpa RutherfordThe Road to Denver'' (1955) as Whipsaw Ellis

References

External links
 
 
 Andy Clyde's entry on Helensburgh Heroes website

Scottish male film actors
British expatriate male actors in the United States
1892 births
1967 deaths
People from Blairgowrie and Rattray
Scottish male television actors
Male actors from Los Angeles
Burials at Forest Lawn Memorial Park (Glendale)
Naturalized citizens of the United States
20th-century American male actors
20th-century Scottish male actors
Scottish male silent film actors
Columbia Pictures contract players